BIOBASE may refer to:

BIOBASE (company), a German bioinformatics company specializing in biological databases
Elsevier BIOBASE, a biological bibliographic database published by Elsevier